Birgit Coufal, (born June 21, 1985 in Vienna) is a professional squash player who represents Austria. She reached a career-high world ranking of World No. 52 in June 2013.

References

External links 

Austrian squash players
Living people
1985 births